John II (123918 November 1305) reigned as Duke of Brittany from 1286 until his death, and was also Earl of Richmond in the Peerage of England. He took part in two crusades prior to his accession to the ducal throne. As a duke, John was involved in the conflicts between the kings of France and England. He was crushed to death in an accident during the celebrations of a papal coronation.

Family and crusades 

John was the eldest son of Duke John I of Brittany and Blanche of Navarre. On 22 January 1260, he married Beatrice, a daughter of King Henry III of England. John was very close to his brother-in-law, Edward I. In 1271, he accompanied Edward to the Ninth Crusade, meeting there with his father and King Louis IX of France. Louis succumbed to an illness in Tunis, and John's father returned to Brittany. John, however, followed Edward to Palestine. The crusade ended the following year, having achieved little. In 1285, John took part in the Aragonese Crusade at the side of King Philip III of France.

Reign 

Upon the death of his father on 8 October 1286, John ascended the throne of Brittany, inheriting also the Earldom of Richmond in the Peerage of England. His namesake son governed Guyenne in the name of his uncle, King Edward, when King Philip IV of France decided to confiscate it in May 1294. John assisted his brother-in-law in the ensuing conflict, but suffered only defeats. When the English army sought to recover by plundering the Breton Abbaye Saint-Mathieu de Fine-Terre in 1296, however, John abandoned Edward's cause. In response, Edward deprived him of the earldom. John proceeded to ally himself with the French, arranging a marriage between his grandson John and King Philip's cousin Isabella of Valois. Philip then raised him into the Peerage of France in September 1297.

Last years and accidental death 

From 1294 until 1304, John assisted the King of France in his campaign against Count Guy of Flanders, taking part in the decisive Battle of Mons-en-Pévèle. Following King Philip's victory, in 1305, John travelled to Lyon to attend the coronation of Pope Clement V. John was leading the Pope's horse through the crowd during the celebrations. So many spectators had piled atop the walls that one of them crumbled and collapsed on top of the Duke. He died four days later, on 18 November. His body was placed in a lead coffin and sent down the Loire. He was buried on 16 December in the Carmelite convent he had founded in Ploërmel.

Issue 
John and Beatrice had six children, several of whom were raised at the court of their uncle King Edward.
 Arthur II, Duke of Brittany (1262–1312)
 John, Earl of Richmond (c. 1266–1334)
 Marie, wife of Guy III of Châtillon (1268–1339)
 Peter, Viscount of Leon (1269–1312)
 Blanche, wife of Philip of Artois (1271–1327)
 Eleanor of Brittany, Abbess of Fontevrault  (1275–1342)

See also

Dukes of Brittany family tree

References

Sources

1239 births
1305 deaths
13th-century dukes of Brittany
14th-century dukes of Brittany
13th-century peers of France
14th-century peers of France
13th-century English nobility
14th-century English nobility
Dukes of Brittany
Earls of Richmond (1268 creation)
House of Dreux
Accidental deaths in France
Christians of Lord Edward's crusade